List of engines produced by GE Transportation Systems and GE Jenbacher (GE Energy). Where possible, recent examples of usage are shown.

Diesel engines
FDL series
 GE 7FDL-8, 8-cylinder engine used in locomotives, such as the GE CM20EMP
 GE 7FDL-12, 12-cylinder engine used in locomotives, such as the GE P32AC-DM
 GE 7FDL-16, 16-cylinder engine used in locomotives, such as the GE AC4400CW

GEVO series (bore 250mm, stroke 320mm)
 GE GEVO-6, 6-cylinder engine used in locomotive repower/modernization applications
 GE GEVO-12, 12-cylinder engine used in locomotives, such as the GE ES30ACi, GE ES44AC, GE ES43ACi, GE ES43ACmi, and MPI HSP46 Diesel Locomotives
 GE GEVO-16, 16-cylinder engine used in locomotives, such as the GE ES59ACi, GE ES58ACi, GE ES57ACi Diesel Locomotives.

HDL series
 GE 7HDL-16, 16-cylinder engine used in only the GE AC6000CW

L250
 GE L250 Series, 6- and 8-cylinder marine engines for propulsion and electric generator usage

PowerHaul series
 GE PowerHaul P616, 16-cylinder engine used in GE PowerHaul series locomotives.

V228 (formerly 7FDM)
 GE V228 Series, 8-, 12-, and 16-cylinder marine engines for propulsion and electric generator usage

V250 (formerly 7HDM)
 GE V250 Series, 12- and 16-cylinder marine engines for propulsion and electric generator usage

Natural gas engines 
Jenbacher series
 INNIO Jenbacher Type 2, 8-cylinder engine for stationary power generation
 INNIO Jenbacher Type 3, 12-, 16-, and 20-cylinder engines for stationary power generation
 INNIO Jenbacher Type 4, 12-, 16-, and 20-cylinder engines for stationary power generation
 INNIO Jenbacher Type 6, 12-, 16-, and 20-cylinder engines for stationary power generation
 INNIO Jenbacher J624 GS, 24-cylinder engine for stationary power generation
 INNIO Jenbacher J920 FleXtra, 20-cylinder engine for stationary power generation

See also 
 List of GE gas turbine engines

References 

GE engines